HMPNGS Buna is a  heavy landing craft operated by the Papua New Guinea Defence Force (PNGDF). Prior to 1974, the vessel was called HMAS Buna (L 132) and was operated by the Royal Australian Navy (RAN).

Design and construction

The eight-vessel Balikpapan class was ordered as a locally manufactured replacement for the Australian Army's LSM-1-class landing ship medium and ALC 50 landing craft. The landing craft have a standard displacement of 316 tons, with a full load displacement of 503 tons. They are propelled by two GM Detroit 6-71 diesel motors, providing 675 brake horsepower to the two propeller shafts, allowing the vessels to reach . The standard ship's company is 13-strong. The Balikpapans are equipped with a Decca RM 916 navigational radar, and fitted with two  machine guns for self-defence.

The LCHs have a maximum payload of 180 tons; equivalent to 3 Leopard 1 tanks, 13 M113 armored personnel carriers 23 quarter-tonne trucks, or four LARC-V amphibious cargo vehicles. As a troop transport, a Balikpapan-class vessel can transport up to 400 soldiers between a larger amphibious ship and the shore, or embark 60 soldiers in six-berth caravans for longer voyages. The flat, box-like keel causes the ships to roll considerably in other-than-calm conditions, limiting their ability to make long voyages.

Buna was laid down by Walkers Limited at Maryborough, Queensland on 31 July 1972, launched on 26 September 1972, and commissioned into the RAN on 7 December 1973.

Operational history
In April 1974, Buna, Betano, and Brunei transited to Lord Howe Island as a demonstration of the Balikpanan class' oceangoing capabilities.

On 14 November 1974, Buna was decommissioned from RAN service and transferred to the Papua New Guinea Defence Force. She is still in service as of 2013.

References

Sources
Books

Journal articles

Balikpapan-class landing craft heavy of the Papua New Guinea Defence Force
1972 ships
Ships built in Queensland